Karel "Karlos" Vémola (born July 1, 1985) is a Czech-British professional mixed martial artist, former bodybuilder, wrestler and member of Sokol. A professional competitor since 2008, he became historically the first UFC fighter from the Czech Republic, and has also competed for UCMMA.

Background
Karel Vémola (Jr.) began training in Greco-Roman wrestling at the age of six under the leadership of his father Karel Vémola and Vojtěch Smolák in Olomouc Sokol of which he is still a member.
 
From the age of 10 until 16, Vemola won six national wrestling titles, and is also a one-time winner of the Czech Republic Wrestling Team Championship as a youth team member of the Krnov wrestling team.

After his parents divorced he moved with his mother from Hanakia to the Bohemia. He resided in the Litice nad Orlicí and he started to train in the gym in Žamberk and he became a classic bodybuilder.

Mixed martial arts career

Early MMA and bodybuilding career
Karlos Vémola moved to England to pursue bodybuilding.

There he became a bouncer in Tottenham. 
He worked as a bouncer in nightclub, which is next to the Tottenham police Station.

At a qualification tournament for British Championship of Bodybuilding he attempted to compete in the Junior Division but because he registered too late he had to compete in the Senior Division which he ended up winning. Because of this victory he was not allowed to compete at the Junior level of the championship so he refused to participate.

While working at his job as a bouncer he threw two men out of the nightclub who turned out to be MMA fighters. This led to his being asked by Alan Mortlock to fight in the Cage Fighters mixed martial arts organization. Karlos Vémola began unofficial and underground fighting at age of 21. Vémola made his professional MMA debut in 2008 when his weight was 255 lbs. Previously he fought in various street fights and underground fighting events.

Vémola won his first seven professional fights all via opening round stoppages in fights held in England by the Cage Fighters Championships and Ultimate Challenge MMA organizations.
In the Cage Fighters Championship Karlos Vémola was the European Heavyweight Champion and World Heavyweight Champion.

He currently trains with the London Shootfighters team alongside MMA notables Alex Reid, John Hathaway and Michael Page.

Ultimate Fighting Championship
In April 2010, Karlos Vémola signed with the UFC. Vémola made his debut at UFC 116 against Jon Madsen. He lost the fight via unanimous decision.

Following his first professional loss, Vémola decided to drop down to the Light Heavyweight division.  He faced Seth Petruzelli on November 13, 2010, at UFC 122 and won the fight via TKO in the first round, picking up his first victory in the UFC, becoming the first man to defeat Petruzelli by strikes, and also earning Knockout of the Night Honors.

Vémola was expected to face Brazilian Luiz Cane on March 19, 2011, at UFC 128. However, Vémola was forced out of the bout with an injury and replaced by Eliot Marshall.

Vémola was expected to face Stephan Bonnar on August 14, 2011, at UFC on Versus 5. However, an injury has forced Bonnar to withdraw from the bout. Newcomer Ronny Markes stepped in for the injured Bonnar to face Vémola.  Vémola lost the fight via unanimous decision (30-27 on all cards).

Vémola was expected to face promotional newcomer Ryan Jimmo on January 20, 2012, at UFC on FX 1.  However, Jimmo was forced from the bout with an injury and the bout was scrapped.

Vémola faced Mike Massenzio in his Middleweight debut on May 5, 2012, at UFC on Fox 3. Vémola won by second round submission via rear-naked choke.

Vémola quickly returned to face Francis Carmont at UFC on Fuel TV: Munoz vs. Weidman. He lost the fight via submission in the second round.

Vémola was expected to face former WEC Middleweight Champion Chris Leben on December 29, 2012, at UFC 155.  However, Vémola was forced out of the bout and replaced by promotional newcomer Derek Brunson.

Vémola faced Caio Magalhães on June 8, 2013, at UFC on Fuel TV 10. Despite a dominant first round, Vémola lost the fight via rear naked choke submission in the second round and was subsequently released from the promotion.

Ultimate Challenge MMA
In his first fight after being released by the UFC, Karlos Vémola won the UCMMA Middleweight Champion by defeating then-champion Denniston Sutherland via unanimous decision on August 3, 2013.

Vémola was to fight against Mahmoud "Steel Man" Salama on February 1, 2014, at UCMMA 38. However, Salama announced that he was withdrawing from his fight against Vémola and replaced by Marvin Campbell. But Campbell did not attend the official Weigh-In and he weighed shortly before the start of the event. It should be a light heavyweight bout but Campbell weighed 215 lb. Vémola defeated Campbell in the first round via submission.

Return to the Czech Republic
After he became UCMMA champion, Vémola decided he should fight in his homeland.

Karlos Vémola signed a contract for two fights with Czech MMA Association and for one fight with Gladiator Championship Fighting. One of the owners of GCF is famous Czech mixed martial artist Michal Hamršmíd.

Czech MMA artist and trainer Petr "Monster" Kníže insulted Karlos Vémola on social network and called him out. Some parts of Kníže martial arts career are unknown and his official MMA record by Sherdog is 3-0 (before fight with Karlos Vémola) but Czech MMA Association promoted his record as 21–0. Karlos Vémola accepted and both would face on November 10, 2013, at MMMA Arena 2 for middleweight title. Vémola won in third round by technical submission.

His next fight was in Prague. He fought longtime GCF Middleweight Champion Tomáš "Thor" Kužela for the GFC Middleweight Championship on December 7, 2013, at GCF 26: Fight Night. Vémola won in the first round by submission.

His next fight in Bohemia was with Polish MMA artist, Sanda and Muay Thai kickboxer Piotr Strus at MMAA Arena 3. He won the fight via unanimous decision.

Vémola faced Henrique da Silva at OKTAGON 13 on July 27, 2019. He won the fight via unanimous decision.

He then faced Attila Vegh at OKTAGON 15 on November 9, 2019. He lost the fight via knockout, halting his 11-fight winning streak.

Vémola was expected to face Václav Mikulášek at OKTAGON 17 on October 17, 2020. However, Mikulášek was unable to make weight (185 lbs) and was replaced by Thomas Robertsen, whom Vémola faced in catchweight bout. Vémola won the fight via third-round submission.

The fight with Mikulášek was rebooked to take place at OKTAGON 19 on December 5, 2020. Vémola won the fight via first-round submission.

Vémola faced Alex Lohoré at OKTAGON 20 on December 30, 2020. He won the fight via unanimous decision and became OKTAGON MMA Middleweight Champion.

Vémola was scheduled to defend his title against Milan Ďatelinka at OKTAGON 22 on March 27, 2021. However, he missed weight and was stripped of the title; the bout proceeded without the championship on the line. Vémola won the fight via first-round submission.

Vémola faced Michał Pasternak on June 4, 2022, at OKTAGON 33. He won the bout via arm-triangle choke in the first round.

Vémola faced Aleksandar Ilić on July 23, 2022, at OKTAGON 34. He won the bout via arm-triangle choke in the first round.

Championships and accomplishments

Mixed martial arts
Ultimate Fighting Championship
Knockout of the Night (One time) 
OKTAGON MMA
OKTAGON MMA Middleweight Champion (One time; former)
OKTAGON MMA Light Heavyweight Champion (One time)
Cage Fighters Championship
Cage Fighters Championship World Heavyweight Champion (One time)
Cage Fighters Championship European Heavyweight Champion (One time)
Ultimate Challenge MMA
Ultimate Challenge MMA Middleweight Champion
Ultimate Challenge MMA Light Heavyweight Champion
Gladiator Championship Fighting
Gladiator Championship Fighting Middleweight Champion
Czech MMA Association
Czech MMA Association Middleweight Champion
Night of Warriors
WASO -96 kg MMA World Champion
X Fight Nights
XFN Light Heavyweight Champion

Mixed martial arts record

|-
| Win
| align=center| 33–6
| Aleksandar Ilić
| Submission (arm-triangle choke)
| OKTAGON 34
| 
| align=center| 1
| align=center| 3:52
| Prague, Czech Republic
| 
|- 
| Win
| align=center| 32–6
| Michał Pasternak
| Submission (arm-triangle choke)
| OKTAGON 33
| 
| align=center|1 
| align=center|3:55
| Frankfurt, Germany
| 
|-
| Win
| align=center| 31–6
| Milan Ďatelinka
| Submission (rear-naked choke)
| OKTAGON 22
| 
| align=center| 1
| align=center| 2:12
| Brno, Czech Republic
| 
|-
| Win
| align=center| 30–6
| Alex Lohoré
| Decision (unanimous)
| OKTAGON 20
| 
| align=center| 5
| align=center| 5:00
| Brno, Czech Republic
| 
|-
| Win
| align=center| 29–6
| Václav Mikulášek 
| Submission (rear-naked choke)
| OKTAGON 19
| 
| align=center| 1
| align=center| 2:05
| Brno, Czech Republic
| 
|-
| Win
| align=center| 28–6
| Thomas Robertsen 
| Submission (north-south choke)
| OKTAGON 17
| 
| align=center| 3
| align=center| 1:02
| Brno, Czech Republic
| 
|-
| Loss
| align=center| 27–6
| Attila Végh
| KO (punch)
| OKTAGON 15
| 
| align=center| 1
| align=center| 2:07
| Prague, Czech Republic
|
|-
| Win
| align=center| 27–5
| Henrique da Silva
| Decision (unanimous)
| OKTAGON 13
| 
| align=center| 3
| align=center| 5:00
| Prague, Czech Republic
|
|-
| Win
| align=center| 26–5
| Prince Aounallah
| Decision (unanimous)
| Night of Warriors 15
| 
| align=center| 3
| align=center| 5:00
| Liberec, Czech Republic
|
|-
| Win
| align=center| 25–5
| Paweł Brandys
| Submission (rear-naked choke)
| OKTAGON 11
| 
| align=center| 1
| align=center| 4:25
| Ostrava, Czech Republic
|
|-
| Win
| align=center| 24–5
| Flavio Rodrigo Magon
| TKO (punches)
| XFN 15
| 
| align=center| 1
| align=center| 1:57
| Prague, Czech Republic
| Return to Light Heavyweight.

|-
| Win
| align=center| 23–5
| Moise Rimbon
| Decision (unanimous)
| XFN 14
| 
| align=center| 3
| align=center| 5:00
| Bratislava, Slovakia
| Middleweight bout.
|-
| Win
| align=center| 22–5
| Mateusz Ostrowski
| TKO (punches)
| XFN 12
| 
| align=center| 2
| align=center| 1:06
| Plzeň, Czech Republic
| Light Heavyweight bout.
|-
| Win
| align=center| 21–5
| Patrik Kincl
| Decision (unanimous)
| XFN 11: Back to the O2 Arena 
| 
| align=center| 3
| align=center| 5:00
| Prague, Czech Republic
| Middleweight bout.
|-
| Win
| align=center| 20–5
| Jamie Sloane
| Submission (rear-naked choke)
| XFN 8: Sloane vs. Vémola 
| 
| align=center| 1
| align=center| 2:06
| Pardubice, Czech Republic
| Defended the X Fight Night Light Heavyweight Championship.
|-
| Win
| align=center| 19–5
| Petr Ondruš
| Submission (rear-naked choke)
| XFN 6: Ondruš vs. Vémola
| 
| align=center| 1
| align=center| 4:40
| Prague, Czech Republic
| Won the X Fight Night Light Heavyweight Championship.
|-
| Win
| align=center| 18–5
| Maximilian Bajlitz
| TKO (punches)
| Night of Warriors 12
| 
| align=center| 1
| align=center| 1:02
| Liberec, Czech Republic
| Catchweight (210 lbs) bout.
|-
| Win
| align=center| 17–5
| Dritan Barjamaj
| TKO (elbows)
| Night of Warriors 10
| 
| align=center| 1
| align=center| 1:43
| Liberec, Czech Republic
|Won Night of Warriors 212 lb Championship.
|-
| Loss
| align=center| 16–5
| Jack Hermansson
| Submission (armbar)
| Warrior Fight Series 4
| 
| align=center| 1
| align=center| 2:06
| London, England
| For the Warrior Fight Series Middleweight Championship.
|-
| Win
| align=center| 16–4
| David Marcina
| Submission (north-south choke)
| Fusion: First Class Fight Night Series 1
| 
| align=center| 1
| align=center| 1:36
| Pardubice, Czech Republic
| 
|-
| Win
| align=center| 15–4
| Carl Kinslow
| Submission (north-south choke)
| UCMMA 43
| 
| align=center| 1
| align=center| 1:16
| London, England
| Won UCMMA Light Heavyweight Championship.
|-
| Win
| align=center| 14–4
| Piotr Strus
| Decision (unanimous)
| MMAA Arena 3
| 
| align=center| 3
| align=center| 5:00
| Hradec Králové, Czech Republic
| Defended Czech MMAA Middleweight Championship.
|-
| Win
| align=center| 13–4
| Marvin Campbell
| Submission (kimura)
| UCMMA 38
| 
| align=center| 1
| align=center| 1:36
| London, England
| Light Heavyweight bout; Campbell weighed 215 lbs.
|-
| Win
| align=center| 12–4
| Tomáš Kužela
| Submission (rear-naked choke)
| GCF 26: Fight Night
| 
| align=center| 1
| align=center| 4:11
| Prague, Czech Republic
| Won GCF Middleweight Championship.
|-
| Win
| align=center| 11–4
| Petr Kníže
| Technical Submission (north-south choke)
| MMAA Arena 2
| 
| align=center| 3
| align=center| 3:23
| Prague, Czech Republic
| Won Czech MMAA Middleweight Championship.
|-
| Win
| align=center| 10–4
| Denniston Sutherland
| Decision (unanimous)
| UCMMA 35
| 
| align=center| 3
| align=center| 5:00
| London, England
| Won UCMMA Middleweight Championship.
|-
| Loss
| align=center| 9–4
| Caio Magalhães
| Submission (rear-naked choke)
| UFC on Fuel TV: Nogueira vs. Werdum
| 
| align=center| 2
| align=center| 2:49
| Fortaleza, Ceará, Brazil
| 
|-
| Loss
| align=center| 9–3
| Francis Carmont
| Submission (rear-naked choke)
| UFC on Fuel TV: Munoz vs. Weidman
| 
| align=center| 2
| align=center| 1:39
| San Jose, California, United States
| 
|-
| Win
| align=center| 9–2
| Mike Massenzio
| Submission (rear-naked choke)
| UFC on Fox: Diaz vs. Miller
| 
| align=center| 2
| align=center| 1:07
| East Rutherford, New Jersey, United States
| Middleweight debut.
|-
| Loss
| align=center| 8–2
| Ronny Markes
| Decision (unanimous)
| UFC Live: Hardy vs. Lytle
| 
| align=center| 3
| align=center| 5:00
| Milwaukee, Wisconsin, United States
| 
|-
| Win
| align=center| 8–1
| Seth Petruzelli
| TKO (punches)
| UFC 122
| 
| align=center| 1
| align=center| 3:46
| Oberhausen, Germany
| Light Heavyweight debut. Knockout of the Night.
|-
| Loss
| align=center| 7–1
| Jon Madsen
| Decision (unanimous)
| UFC 116
| 
| align=center| 3
| align=center| 5:00
| Las Vegas, Nevada, United States
| 
|-
| Win
| align=center| 7–0
| Peter Yendall
| KO (punches)
| UCMMA 10: Resurrection
| 
| align=center| 1
| align=center| 0:49
| London, England
| 
|-
| Win
| align=center| 6–0
| Stav Economou
| Submission (rear-naked choke)
| Cage Fighters Championship 7
| 
| align=center| 1
| align=center| 1:57
| Purfleet, Essex, England
| Won CFC World Heavyweight Championship, Defended CFC European Heavyweight Championship.
|-
| Win
| align=center| 5–0
| Ashley Pollard
| Technical Submission (rear-naked choke)
| Cage Fighters Championship 6
| 
| align=center| 1
| align=center| 0:36
| Purfleet, Essex, England
| Defended CFC European Heavyweight Championship.
|-
| Win
| align=center| 4–0
| Markus Hipp
| TKO (punches)
| Cage Fighters Championship 5
| 
| align=center| 1
| align=center| 0:15
| Brentwood, Essex, England
| Won CFC European Heavyweight Championship.
|-
| Win
| align=center| 3–0
| Szilvester Silbont
| Submission (rear-naked choke)
| Cage Fighters Championship 4
| 
| align=center| 1
| align=center| 3:14
| Brentwood, Essex, England
| 
|-
| Win
| align=center| 2–0
| Bill Georgitsis
| TKO (punches)
| Cage Fighters Championship 3
| 
| align=center| 1
| align=center| 0:05
| Rochester, Kent, England
| 
|-
| Win
| align=center| 1–0
| Patric Carroll
| Submission (rear-naked choke)
| Cage Fighters Championship 2
| 
| align=center| 1
| align=center| 0:44
| Purfleet, Essex, England
|

Personal life
In July 2022 Vémola married his long-time girlfriend, Slovak Playboy model Lela Vémola (née Lenka Ceterová). The couple had been dating since 2017 and got engaged in 2020. They have two children together - daughter Lili (*2019) and son Rocky (*2021). Vémola also has two children from his previous relationship - son Karlos Jr. (*2010) and stepdaughter Sky (*2007). The family alternates between living in Prague and in London.

Media appearances
In 2010, he appeared as a fictionalised version of himself in the controversial movie Killer Bitch.

References

External links

Official UFC Profile
T.J. Sokol Olomouc official website
Official London Shootfighters Profile
Official Garnell Nutrition Profile

1985 births
Living people
Sportspeople from Olomouc
Czech male mixed martial artists
Middleweight mixed martial artists
Light heavyweight mixed martial artists
Heavyweight mixed martial artists
Mixed martial artists utilizing Greco-Roman wrestling
Czech bodybuilders
Czech male sport wrestlers
Ultimate Fighting Championship male fighters